Linda Watiri Muriuki, is a Kenyan  lawyer, who is the managing partner at LJA Associates, a law firm based in Nairobi, Kenya's capital city. Since her appointment in September 2017, she concurrently serves as a member of the board of directors at Safaricom Plc., the largest mobile network provider in Kenya.

Background and education
She was born in Nigeria in 1964. In 1983 she was admitted to York University, in Toronto, Canada, where she graduated with a Bachelor of Arts degree in Economics. She then transferred to the University of Leeds in the United Kingdom, where she obtained a Bachelor of Laws degree in 1988. She then underwent training Advocates Training Programme at the Kenya School of Law, in Nairobi and was admitted to the Kenyan Bar. In 2010, she obtained a Global Executive Masters of Business Administration from the United States International University Africa in collaboration with Columbia University, in New York City.

Work experience
Muriuki worked as a law partner with two law firms in Kenya, before joining LJA Associates. She was partner at Daly & Inamdar, Advocates (1997–2003) and at McVicker & Muriuki (2004–2011). In 2011 she joined LJA Associates where she is a senior partner and the managing partner.

Other considerations
She also serves as a board member of East Africa Reinsurance Company Limited. She has previously served as a non-executive director of Old Mutual Life Assurance Company Limited (2004–2010) and of the Capital Markets Authority of Kenya (2015–2017). She is (a) a member of the Law Society of Kenya (b) a member of the Institute of Directors of Kenya (c) a Chevening Scholar and (d) an Eisenhower Fellow of Kenya (2003).

See also
 Rose Ogega
 Esther Koimett
 Kathryne Maundu

References

External links
Biography of Linda Watiri Muriuki
Safaricom appoints two new directors As of 2 September 2017.

Living people
1963 births
Kikuyu people
20th-century Kenyan lawyers
York University alumni
Kenya School of Law alumni
Alumni of the University of Leeds
United States International University alumni
21st-century Kenyan lawyers